Ensign Arthur Marcus Hill Cheek (31 July 1840 – 16 June 1857) was an East India Company Officer known posthumously as "the young martyr of Allahabad." Cheek joined the East India Company's Bengal Army in February 1857, arrived in India on 28 April, and was posted to the 6th Regiment of Bengal Native Infantry on 28 April of that year. On 6 June the regiment mutinied, Cheek was captured by mutinying sepoys and died on 16 June. Witnesses stated that Cheek refused to renounce his Christian faith during his captivity despite being held in stocks in the sun, in an attempt to encourage him to convert to Islam.

Early life

Arthur Marcus Hill Cheek, the fourth child of Oswald Cheek and Emma Ashwin, was born in Evesham, Worcestershire, United Kingdom on 31 July 1840. He was given the names "Arthur Marcus Hill" in honour of his Godfather, Lord Arthur Marcus Cecil Hill who was the Member of Parliament for Evesham at the time of his birth. He was baptised on 15 August 1840 at the Parish Church of All Saints, Evesham.

Military service

When Arthur was 16 his father obtained, with the help of Arthur's Godfather Lord Hill, a direct appointment for him with the East India Company's Army. He was not required to attend Addiscombe Military Seminary for the standard two years but he was required to pass an examination, which he did on 3 February 1857. He was appointed as an Ensign in the Bengal Army on 4 February 1857. He departed from Southampton on 20 March, arriving in Calcutta on 28 April. He was then assigned to the 6th Regiment of Bengal Native Infantry who were currently stationed in Allahabad. After taking leave for three weeks to visit family who were living in India Ensign Cheek made his way to his Regiment, arriving on 19 May.

Mutiny of the 6th Regiment of Bengal Native Infantry
The Indian Mutiny began at Meerut on 10 May 1857. The Officers of the 6th Bengal Native Infantry had full confidence in their men and around 80 members of that regiment formed the guard at Allahabad Fort. On the evening of 6 June the officers were called out from the mess to the parade square by a bugle sounded by members of the 6th Bengal Native Infantry, who then shot the officers. Ensign Cheek, however, was not among them. He had returned to his own home.

Ensign Cheek sustained a cut from a sabre on that evening but managed to escape from the Fort, although the details of his method of escape are not recorded. After five days he was discovered badly injured in a ravine by mutinying members of the 6th Bengal Native Infantry and taken prisoner. On the morning of 16 June, Ensign Cheek was brought into the fort on a stretcher. He died that same evening and was buried in the grounds of the fort following a Christian funeral on the morning of 17 June.

Account of "martyrdom"
The Reverend Gopenauth Nundy stated that he was held prisoner with Ensign Cheek during his captivity. He said that attempts were made by their captors to convert them from Christianity to Islam by keeping the prisoners in stocks in the sun without water until they capitulated. Reverend Nundy claimed that Ensign Cheek said to him "Padre Sahib, hold onto your faith – don't give it up!"  A fellow prisoner, Mrs Coleman, reported that Ensign Cheek told her to "be true to your faith and hope."

A memorial tablet, inscribed with the following, was placed on the Cheek family tomb in the graveyard next to the Parish Church of All Saints in Evesham:

References

1840 births
1857 deaths
British East India Company Army officers
British military personnel killed in the Indian Rebellion of 1857
British military personnel of the Indian Rebellion of 1857
People from Evesham